Veruli is a 2017 Indian Tamil-language action thriller film produced, written and directed by P. Amudhavanan. Starring Abhishek Vinod, Syed Subahan, Ravi Prakash and Archana Singh, the film's original score and soundtrack were composed by V. M. Dinesh Raja and R. S. Raj Prathap, and has cinematography by Siva Prabhu.

The film's plotline revolved on potholes in India which have become death traps. The film had a theatrical release across Tamil Nadu on 16 June 2017.

Plot

Cast 

 Abhishek Vinod as Ashwin
 Syed Subahan
 Ravi Prakash
 Archana Singh
 Shanmugasundaram
 T. M. Karthik
 Jayachandran as Shankar
 Hari
 G. Saravanan
 Ashok Pandian
 Roobika Jayakumar
 Indhumathy Manikandan
 Sanjay
 K. Bhagyaraj in a guest appearance

Production 
The film's director, Amudhavanan, who had previously worked on several short films, chose to make his first film on the topic of road safety. He quit his job at Tata Motors to make the film. Principal photography commenced on 8 April 2016 in Chennai. The film was shot in Chennai, Chittoor, Coimbatore and Kerala and was completed within 40 days by June 2016.

Singer Syed Subhahan made his debut as an actor with this film and portrayed the son of K. Bhagyaraj's character. He was approached by the director Amudhavanan, who was impressed by Syed's speeches on social issues during his participation in the Super Singer reality show. The film was among actor Shanmugasundaram's final films, as he died in August 2017.

Soundtrack 
The music was composed by V. M. Dinesh Raja and R. S. Raj Prathap.

Marketing 
A promotional event for the film was held in January 2017, and was notable for being "paperless". No papers or banners promoting the film were created, and guests were asked to use their smartphone instead and use the SHAREit app to promote the film. Amudhavanan noted "we want to motivate our audience to be socially responsible and want them to travel with us till the release of the movie".

Release and reception 
The film had a theatrical release across Tamil Nadu on 16 June 2017. A reviewer from Maalai Malar gave the film a middling review, while noting the screenplay improves as the film develops. Following the film's release, Amudhavanan announced that profits from the film would be spent for social causes and to create awareness on road safety.

References

External links 
 

2010s Tamil-language films
2017 action thriller films
2017 films
Indian action thriller films